A lost episode is an episode of a television or radio series which now is, or in the past was, not available for rerun or release on home video or DVD.

Lost television broadcast, television series or their episodes that are missing

Lost episode may also refer to:
List of Lost episodes, episodes of the television series Lost
"The Sponge Who Could Fly", also titled "The Lost Episode", an episode of SpongeBob SquarePants
"The Lost Episode", an episode of Blue's Clues